Nosferatu the Vampyre is an action game based on the film of the same name and runs on the Amstrad CPC, Commodore 64 and ZX Spectrum computers. It was developed by Design Design and published by Piranha Software in 1986.

Plot
An estate agent named Jonathan Harker explores a castle to find some important papers, while his wife Lucy pursues the vampire that dwells in the castle.

Gameplay
The game consists of three different stages. In each stage the player takes the role of a different character; Jonathan in the first stage, Van Helsing (along with Jonathan and Lucy) in the second stage and Lucy in the third stage. The castle rooms are displayed in an isometric view. The player can pick up four different items including one weapon (such as a gun), one tool (for example a lamp) and a healing item (like food).

Reception

The game was praised for its excellent detailed graphics and animation while being comparable to The Great Escape.

References

External links

1980s horror video games
1986 video games
Action video games
Amstrad CPC games
Commodore 64 games
Gothic video games
Nosferatu
Piranha Software games
Single-player video games
Video games about vampires
Video games based on Dracula
Video games developed in the United Kingdom
Video games set in castles
Video games with isometric graphics
ZX Spectrum games